Lina Mazhar Annab ( Līnā Maẓhar ʿAnnāb; born November 29, 1966) is a Jordanian businessperson, politician and the previous Minister of Tourism and Antiquities in Jordan. She has been the ambassador to Japan since June 19, 2019.

Education & career
Annab graduated from Georgetown University in the United States. 

She has been a General Manager in Zara Investment Company since 2008. She was made the Minister of Tourism and Antiquities in the cabinet of Hani Mulki in June 2016. She was elected to the board of American Center of Oriental Research, she resigned her position after she was appointed government minister. She patronized the Arab Aviation summit in Jordan on 3 December 2016. She headed the Jordanian delegation to the 41st session of UNESCO’s World Heritage Committee. She helped organize an Opera Festival in Jordan in 2017; which was a first in the Arab world.

Towards the end of Annab's term as the Minister of Tourism and Antiquities, on October 25, 2018, a school bus was raided by fatal heavy floods in Dead Sea region and 21 lives were lost. On November 1 of 2018, the then Minister of Education and Annab submitted their resignations to take responsibility for the incident .

Annab was formally sworn before King Abdullah II as the Jordanian ambassador to Japan. Ambassador Annab presented her letter of credence to Japanese Emperor Naruhito at the Tokyo Imperial Palace on June 19, 2019.

References

External links
 

1966 births
Living people
Government ministers of Jordan
21st-century Jordanian women politicians
21st-century Jordanian politicians
Jordanian women ambassadors
Jordanian businesspeople
Georgetown University alumni
Women government ministers of Jordan
Ambassadors of Jordan to Japan
Tourism ministers of Jordan